KNAK or variation, may refer to:

Callsign K-NAK/KNAK
 KNAK (AM), a radio station (540 AM) licensed to serve Delta, Utah, United States
 KNAK-LP, a radio station (97.1 FM) licensed to serve Naknek, Alaska, United States
 KZNS (AM), a radio station (1280 AM) licensed to serve Salt Lake City, Utah, which held the call sign KNAK from 1945 to 1976

Other uses
 Thomas Knak (born 1973) Danish musician

See also

 
 Knake (disambiguation)
 Knack (disambiguation)
 NAC (disambiguation)
 Nak (disambiguation)
 Naq (disambiguation)
 WNAK (disambiguation); including callsign W-NAK